Deportivo Oceanía is a surface metro station in Gustavo A. Madero borough, in México City Mexico. Its represented by a koala clinging to a soccer ball. This metro station is named after nearby Deportivo Oceanía sports center, located north of the city; it offers many sports activities, like Tae Kwon Do, Volleyball, Soccer, with low fares, from $26.00 México Peso to $40. Deportivo Oceanía has facilities for the handicapped, and it is located near Avenida 608 avenue.

The station was opened on 15 December 1999.

From 23 April to 28 June 2020, the station was temporarily closed due to the COVID-19 pandemic in Mexico.

Ridership

References

External links 

Mexico City Metro Line B stations
Railway stations opened in 1999
1999 establishments in Mexico
Mexico City Metro stations in Gustavo A. Madero, Mexico City
Accessible Mexico City Metro stations